Evert Brouwers (born 17 June 1990) is a Dutch former professional footballer who plays for amateur side SV Zeist.

Club career
He made his senior debut for Utrecht in the 2010-11 season. After AGOVV dissolved, Brouwers played for Hoofdklasse clubs DOVO and SDC Putten before joining his first club Zeist in 2015. In summer 2016 he was ready to return to SDC Putten after completing his studies, only to change his mind after finding a job as a baker which prevented him from playing on Saturdays.

References

1990 births
Living people
People from Zeist
Association football forwards
Dutch footballers
FC Utrecht players
AGOVV Apeldoorn players
VV DOVO players
SDC Putten players
Eredivisie players
Eerste Divisie players
Footballers from Utrecht (province)